Dana McCleese (born September 6, 1965), better known by his stage name Dana Dane, is an American rapper known for performance of humorous lyrics and for his fashion sense.

Early life
Dana was born in the Walt Whitman housing project in Fort Greene, Brooklyn, New York City, New York.

Career

Recording artist
Dana Dane's career began as part of the Kangol Crew with fellow rapper Slick Rick, to whom he sounded markedly similar, although Slick Rick's English lilt was actually genuine, while Dana Dane's was an affectation. Dana Dane appeared in the video for Slick Rick's 1988 single "Teenage Love". After graduating from high school, he signed with Profile Records in 1985.

Dana Dane's debut album, Dana Dane with Fame, peaked at #46 on the Billboard album chart and was certified gold. His debut single was "Nightmares". His biggest hit in the United States was "Cinderfella Dana Dane", which peaked at #11 on Billboard magazine's R&B charts in 1987. Cheryl Green from Queens, NY sang backup. He was among Profile Records’s core artists, then recorded briefly for Rap-A-Lot Records but did not release anything on that label. He released his last album, Rollin' Wit Dana Dane, in 1995 on Maverick Records.

Other activities
Dane operated a clothing boutique in New York City in the late 1980s and early 1990s. For six years, he was an on-air host for Sirius/XM Satellite Radio on its classic hip-hop channel LL Cool J's Rock the Bells radio (formerly BackSpin).

He makes a cameo appearance as himself in the 2002 film Brown Sugar.

In 2009, he released his first novel, Numbers (One World/Ballantine/Random House).

Discography

Studio albums

Compilation albums

Singles

References

External links
Official Web Site

Living people
1965 births
Rappers from Brooklyn
Maverick Records artists
Profile Records artists
Rap-A-Lot Records artists
21st-century American rappers
People from Fort Greene, Brooklyn